Langanes Air Station (ADC/NATO ID: H-2/H-2A) is a closed United States Air Force General Surveillance Radar station. The new station (H-2A) was closed on 28 June 2006 as part of the closure of United States military facilities in Iceland.

History
Langanes Air Station (H-2) was established in 1951, shortly after the return of United States military forces to Iceland.  The site was operated by the 667th Aircraft Control and Warning Squadron, and was equipped with AN/FPS-3 and AN/FPS-20 radars.

The Greenland, Iceland and United Kingdom air defense sector, better known as the GIUK gap, was routinely utilized by the Soviet Union's long-range heavy bombers and maritime reconnaissance platforms as a transit point towards the Atlantic Ocean. From bases located at Archangel and Murmansk, Soviet aircraft would stream down to the North Cape in Norway towards the Gap which was use as a doorway to the vast Atlantic. Most of the Soviet missions were destined to probe United States’ air defense along the North Atlantic and after 1960 in the Caribbean where Cuba, the USSR's most important satellite state outside continental Europe, was located. Such was the perceived threat from the Soviet incursions that it became a priority for NATO to demonstrate to that the strategic Giuk passage would be monitored at all times.

In January 1961, the H-2 search radar bubble was blown down during a storm. The site was closed as a radar base and the 667th AC&W Squadron was moved to Hofn Air Station (H-3), where it replaced the 933d Aircraft Control and Warning Squadron. (note: the original site was used for several years as a communications site and for submarine detection)

In 1992 "Langanes Air Station" was re-opened at a new site (H-2A) at Gunnolfvikursfjall, located 15km to the southwest on a cliff along the coast. The 667th Air Control Squadron operated an AN/FPS-117v5 radar from that site until 2006, when the station was closed.

The original H-2 site today is abandoned, long since left to the elements. Some foundations remain however the location is desolate and windswept. The AN/FPS-117 radar tower remains at the H-2A site, but it is unused.

See also
 United States general surveillance radar stations

References

  A Handbook of Aerospace Defense Organization  1946–1980,  by Lloyd H. Cornett and Mildred W. Johnson, Office of History, Aerospace Defense Center, Peterson Air Force Base, Colorado
  Information for Langanes AS, IS

Radar stations of the United States Air Force in Iceland
Military installations closed in 2006